Mills High School is a public high school in Millbrae, California, one of seven in the San Mateo Union High School District.

Mills was established in 1958. Mills High School has been named a California Distinguished School three times (1988, 1996, 2009).

Academics
In 2012, Mills was granted a six-year accreditation through the Western Association of Schools and Colleges.

Mills has Advanced Placement course offerings. 

In 2015 it was ranked the 225th best public high school in the country by Newsweek.  In 2013 it was ranked 519th nationally by U.S. News & World Report.

Statistics

Demographics

2017-2018
 1,220 students: 617 Male (50.6%), 603 Female (49.4%)

Approximately 22.3% of the students at Mills are served by the free or reduced-price lunch program.

Standardized testing

Athletics
Mills has a wide array of sports throughout the school year. In the fall, the sports are: Girls' Tennis, Girls' Golf, Water Polo, Cross Country, Football, and Volleyball. Winter sports include: Basketball, Soccer, and Wrestling. Spring sports consist of: Badminton, Baseball, Boys' Golf, Softball, Swimming, Boys' Tennis, and Track and Field.

Notable alumni and faculty
Jeff Novitzky (1986) - Vice President of Athlete Health and Performance for UFC
Paul Fanaika (2004) — NFL Football Player
Larry Grenadier — Jazz bassist
Gordon Lish (faculty) — Editor, author, teacher
Leslie Maxie (1985) — Olympic athlete 1988 Summer Olympics
Frank Portman (a.k.a. Dr. Frank) — Lead singer of the Mr. T Experience
Wesley Chan (2002) — founding member of Wong Fu Productions
Adam Tafralis (2002) — Canadian Football League Quarterback and San Jose State career passing yards record holder
James van Hoften (1962) — NASA astronaut
Craig Venter (1964) - Scientist, winner of 2008 National Medal of Science and twice named to Time 100 list of the world's most influential people

See also

San Mateo County high schools

References

External links
 Official site of Mills High School
 School newspaper

High schools in San Mateo County, California
Millbrae, California
Public high schools in California
1958 establishments in California